Cosmo D'Angeli (29 October 1889 – 28 November 1968) was an Italian painter and sculptor.

Life and works 
Cosmo D'Angeli was born on 29 October 1889 in Rome, Italy. His family owned a bakery near Termini Station. After graduating from the Accademia di Belle Arti di Roma, he began showing his paintings and sculptures on the Via del Babuino, Via Milano, Via Veneto, Via Margutta, and in galleries in Rome. He won various prizes, including the "La Tavoletta D'oro".

His style, at first Impressionist, changed in time to reflect the art and technique of the Macchiaioli. He was also devoted to sculpture and worked as architect in the zone of Rome and Anzio Colonia.

Many of his paintings are in collections outside of Italy: France, Germany, England, Belgium and the United States. His work has also been listed in the catalogs of international art action houses.

D'Angeli died of cancer in Rome on 28 November 1968, leaving his wife Adelaide and his daughter Anna.

Bibliography 
 Magazine "Scena Illustrata", 1965, Roma

1889 births
1968 deaths
20th-century Italian painters
Italian male painters
20th-century Italian sculptors
20th-century Italian male artists
Italian male sculptors
Deaths from cancer in Lazio